Brierley is a village in the Forest of Dean, Gloucestershire, United Kingdom. It has one petrol station and a shop, both of which are both operated by Jet.

Brierley was the birthplace of Winifred Foley (25 July 1914 – 21 March 2009) author of the autobiographical A Child in the Forest (1974), and other later works including No Pipe Dreams for Father (1977). The village was also the birthplace of her father, Charlie Mason, who led the hunger march to the workhouse of Westbury during the pit strikes of May 1926.

Nearest places
Ruardean Woodside
Ruardean Hill
Lydbrook
The Pludds

External links
photos of Brierley and surrounding area on geograph

Villages in Gloucestershire
Forest of Dean